Politics, Philosophy & Economics is a quarterly peer-reviewed academic journal that covers philosophical aspects of political science and economy. It was established in 2002 and is published by SAGE Publications.

Abstracting and indexing
The journal is abstracted and indexed in Academic Search Premier, the British Humanities Index, Current Contents, the Economic Literature Index, Scopus, and the Social Sciences Citation Index. According to the Journal Citation Reports, the journal has a 2015 impact factor of 0.512, ranking it =115th out of 163 journals in the category "Political Science" and 37th out of 51 journals in the category "Ethics".

See also 
 List of ethics journals
 List of political science journals

References

External links
 

Publications established in 2002
Economics journals
Philosophy journals
Quarterly journals
SAGE Publishing academic journals
English-language journals
Political science journals